Polglass  is a long crofting township, lying on the north shore of the sea loch, Loch Broom in Ullapool Ross-shire, Scottish Highlands and is in the Scottish council area of Highland.

Populated places in Ross and Cromarty